Sir Cyril Jackson KBE (6 February 1863 – 3 September 1924) was a British educationist, important in the development of education in Western Australia.

Jackson, the eldest son of Laurence Morris Jackson and Louisa Elizabeth Craven, was born in Dartmouth Park Road in Kentish Town. Educated at the Charterhouse School and New College, Oxford, Jackson graduated in 1885 with honours in Literae Humaniores. After leaving Oxford he took up social work at Toynbee Hall for about 10 years from 1885, and was central secretary of the Children's Country Holiday Fund. He became a member of the London School Board in 1891, and in 1896 was appointed inspector-general of schools in Western Australia. Education in the colony had been for many years in a pitifully primitive state, but in 1890 a forward step was made by the appointment of an Englishman, J. P. Walton, as inspector of schools. He pointed out how far behind the schools were lagging, and brought about many improvements. But the population was increasing very rapidly, numerous new schools were being built, and it was realized that the system would have to be completely re-organized.

With Walton as his first assistant, Jackson set to work with vigor. Jackson had great educational knowledge and first rate executive ability, and the foundations on which future developments could be raised were securely laid. In 1899 a beginning was made with technical education, in the following year school fees were abolished, and in 1902 Claremont Teachers College was opened for the training of teachers. The designs of the schools, the staffing and equipment, were all greatly improved. He also became the first Chairman of the West Guildford Roads Board (predecessor to the Town of Bassendean), the inaugural meeting of which was held in the billiard room of Jackson’s house on 12 July 1901. Official recognition of the new municipality followed a week later on 19 July 1901. When Jackson returned to England aboard the Indic in 1903 he left behind him a well-organized modern system of education. An economist, an Anglican churchman, and a believer in voluntary agencies, he opposed unnecessary expenditure, and supported non-provided schools. 

In England Jackson became a chief inspector to the Board of Education in London until 1906, and found that his services were wanted in many directions. In 1907 he was elected a member of the London County Council, and six years later became an alderman. For two years from 1908 he was chairman of the education committee. In 1910-11 he acted as agent-general for Western Australia, and among the other positions he filled were member of Senate of the University of London (1908–21), governor of Imperial College of Science (1908–16), chairman, London intelligence committee on unemployment and distress (1914), chairman of London County Council (1915; de facto Leader 1911-15: the position of Leader was not officially recognised until 1933), and member central appeal tribune (1915–16 and 1917–18). He did much war work and was vice-chairman of the war pensions committee. He represented the board of education at two conferences held in the United States, and found time to write two books, Unemployment and Trade Unions (1910), and Outlines of Education in England (1913). He also collaborated with A. Riley and M. E. Sadler in another, The Religious Question in Public Education. He never lost his interest in Western Australia and only two days before his death attended a meeting at the agent-general's office to give his advice on a Western Australian educational problem.

Jackson died on 3 September 1924, he had been appointed a Knight Commander of the Most Excellent Order of the British Empire in 1917.

References

1863 births
1924 deaths
British Anglicans
Knights Commander of the Order of the British Empire
British educational theorists
People educated at Charterhouse School
Alumni of New College, Oxford
Members of London County Council
Municipal Reform Party politicians
Members of the London School Board
Mayors of places in Western Australia
Western Australian local councillors